Golian (also Romanized as Golīān and Guliān) is a village in Baqeran Rural District, in the Central District of Birjand County, South Khorasan Province, Iran. At the 2006 census, its population was 143, in 42 families.

References 

Populated places in Birjand County